This is a list of notable European exchange-traded funds, or ETFs.  These are ETFs that are traded on European exchanges. (This list does not include ETFs that invest in European stocks but trade on other exchanges, such as the New York Stock Exchange. For example, the list below does not include the large Vanguard Europe ETF (ticker: VGK; name: Vanguard MSCI Europe ETF) which trades in the United States.)

Cross-border ETFs
In the European Union many ETFs are traded as cross-border UCITS III funds. For example the UK iShares and ETF Securities are Irish registered UCITS funds and trade on the London Stock Exchange. Other ETF's are offered by Indexchange Investments AG, whose funds are listed in Germany on the Deutsche Börse. Indexchange was a subsidiary of HypoVereinsbank. It has been acquired by Barclays Global Investors.

 ETFS All Commodities DJ-AIGCISM
 ETFS Energy DJ-AIGCISM
 iShares DJ STOXX 50
 iShares DJ EURO STOXX 50
 Indexchange DJ Euro Stoxx EX
 Indexchange DJ Euro Stoxx 50 EX
 Indexchange DJ Stoxx 50 EX
 Lyxor ETF DJ Euro Stoxx 50
 Lyxor ETF MSCI Europe

German ETFs 

Deutsche Börse provides trading for more than 1000 ETFs in Frankfurt in its Xetra system. The ten largest ETFs on Xetra by fund volume are

 iShares Core S&P 500 
 iShares Core DAX (DE) 
 iShares S&P 500 (Dist)
 iShares Core Euro Corporate Bond 
 Lyxor EURO STOXX 50
 iShares Core MSCI World 
 iShares EURO STOXX 50 (DE) 
 iShares Euro High Yield Corporate Bond
 iShares Euro Corporate Bond Large Cap 
 iShares J.P. Morgan USD Emerging Markets Bond 

Many other ETFs (relevant or not) are also traded at this and other German exchanges.

Finnish ETFs 
 SLG OMXH25 – It is a market value weighted index that consists of the 25 most-traded stock classes. Provided by Seligson & Co Fund Management
 XACT OMXH25 – Same as above by Handelsbanken Mutual Fund Company Ltd.

Norwegian ETFs 
Listed at Oslo Stock Exchange Oslo Stock Exchange
DnB NOR OBX
XACT OBX
XACT Derivat BEAR
XACT Derivat BULL

Swedish ETFs 
In Sweden XACT Fonder is the largest provider of ETFs with Nordic exposure. As of September 2010, 20 ETF's were provided by XACT:  Updated 02.05.15 there are 10 active today:

 XACT Bull – leveraged ETF tracking approx.1,5 times daily OMXS30 returns, fee 0.6%
 XACT Bear – short leveraged ETF, tracking approx.1,5 times daily opposite OMXS30 returns, fee 0.6%
 XACT Bull 2 – leveraged ETF tracking 2 times daily OMXS30 returns, fee 0.6%
 XACT Bear 2 – short leveraged ETF, tracking 2 times daily opposite OMXS30 returns, fee 0.6%
 XACT Derivat Bull – leveraged ETF tracking 2 times daily OBX returns, fee 0.8%
 XACT Derivat Bear – short leveraged ETF, tracking approx.2 times daily opposite OBX returns, fee 0.8%
 XACT OMXS30 – tracking 30 most traded stocks on Stockholm Stock Exchange, fee 0.3%
 XACT OMXSB – tracking 80–100 most traded stocks on Stockholm Stock Exchange, fee 0.15%
 XACT OBX – tracking 25 most traded stocks on Oslo Stock Exchange, fee 0.3%
 XACT Nordic 30 – tracking 30 most traded stocks in the Nordic region (Sweden, Norway, Finland, Denmark), fee 0.15%

See also
List of exchange-traded funds
List of American exchange-traded funds

References

External links
 https://finance.yahoo.com/q/pr?s=VGK+Profile
European